The Capital Library, also known as the Capital Library of China, shortened as CLCN, is the largest public library in Beijing,  located in Chaoyang District. The library is noted for its collection of Chinese opera, classical music, drama and theater. 

On November 1, 2013, after the National Library of China succumbed to government pressure, the Capital Library accepted a lecture by Australian historian Ross Terrill, who delivered a speech on the theme of "Mao Zedong in the Eyes of a Biographer: His Life, Personality and Ideology".

History
Founded in 1913 by Lu Xun, Capital Library evolved from the merger of the Capital Books Branch, the Capital Popular Library and the Central Park Library Reading Office, which were respectively established in June 1913, October 1913 and August 1917. 

After the Revolution of the Northern Expedition, these three libraries were renamed and merged several times and changed to the Beijing Municipal No. 1 Library; in August 1949, the name was changed to the Beijing Municipal Library; in October 1956, the official name was given to the Capital Library.

References

Libraries in Beijing
Public libraries in China
Buildings and structures in Beijing
Libraries established in 1913
Educational institutions established in 1913
1913 establishments in China